Warren "Oak" Felder (born November 9, 1980) is a Turkish-born American songwriter and record producer based in Atlanta and Los Angeles. He is known for his work as part of the production duo Pop & Oak, and was nominated for a Grammy Award in 2015.

Early life
Felder was born and raised in Istanbul, Turkey. He studied network technologies and artificial intelligence at Istanbul Technical University, and then moved to the United States in 2001 to attend Georgia Tech. His nickname comes from his Turkish name, Okay.

Career
While at Georgia Tech, Felder recorded a demo with the singer/songwriter Sterling Simms, which led to a meeting with L.A. Reid and resulted in Felder writing and producing a track on a Mariah Carey album in 2005.

Around 2009, Felder became production partners with Pop Wansel as the production duo Pop & Oak. Their first big hit was "Your Love", the lead single on Nicki Minaj's 2010 debut studio album Pink Friday. Other notable songs they have written and produced include six tracks on Elle Varner's 2012 album Perfectly Imperfect, including the singles "Only Wanna Give It to You" and "I Don't Care"; nine songs on Kehlani's debut album SweetSexySavage; and six tracks on Alessia Cara's 2015 debut album Know-It-All, including the singles "Here" and "Scars to Your Beautiful", which both went to number 1 on the Billboard Mainstream Top 40 charts.
 
Felder was nominated for a 2015 Grammy Award for Best R&B Song for writing Usher's single "Good Kisser"; produced two songs on the Alicia Keys album Girl on Fire, which won the 2014 Grammy Award for Best R&B Album; wrote and produced "Invincible", the lead single from Kelly Clarkson's 2015 album Piece by Piece; wrote and produced "Clumsy", the second single from the 2016 Britney Spears album Glory; and wrote and produced five tracks on Demi Lovato's 2017 album Tell Me You Love Me, including the lead single "Sorry Not Sorry", winning a 2019 BMI Pop Award for the single. He has also written and produced songs for artists including Trey Songz, Rihanna, Miguel, Kehlani, Ariana Grande, Jennifer Lopez, Mario, Tamia, ZZ Ward, and Sabrina Carpenter. He was named as a top producer by BMI in 2012 and 2013, and won a 2017 BMI Pop Award for co-writing Alessia Cara's "Here", and a 2018 BMI Pop Award for co-writing her single "Scars to Your Beautiful". He also wrote and produced three tracks on Lizzo's 2019 major label debut Cuz I Love You, wrote and produced the top 40 single "Who Do You Love" by The Chainsmokers featuring 5 Seconds of Summer, and is working on new music with Kehlani, Demi Lovato, and Alessia Cara in 2019. 

Felder is published by Reservoir, and managed by Lucas Keller and Peter Coquillard at Milk & Honey. He is on the board of directors of the Mechanical Licensing Collective, which works to increase the royalty money from streaming companies to songwriters.

Personal life
Felder is married and lives in Atlanta, Georgia, and has a studio in Los Angeles, California.

Awards

Discography

Writing and producing credits

References

External links
 

Living people
1980 births
Turkish emigrants to the United States
American record producers
American male songwriters
Musicians from Atlanta
Georgia Tech alumni
Istanbul Technical University alumni